The dyadic transformation (also known as the dyadic map, bit shift map, 2x mod 1 map, Bernoulli map, doubling map or sawtooth map) is the mapping (i.e., recurrence relation)

 
 

(where  is the set of sequences from ) produced by the rule

 
 .

Equivalently, the dyadic transformation can also be defined as the iterated function map of the piecewise linear function

 

The name bit shift map arises because, if the value of an iterate is written in binary notation, the next iterate is obtained by shifting the binary point one bit to the right, and if the bit to the left of the new binary point is a "one", replacing it with a zero.

The dyadic transformation provides an example of how a simple 1-dimensional map can give rise to chaos. This map readily generalizes to several others. This map has been extensively studied by many authors. It was introduced by Alfréd Rényi in 1957, and an invariant measure for it was given by Alexander Gelfond in 1959 and again independently by Bill Parry in 1960.

Relation to the Bernoulli process

The map can be obtained as a homomorphism on the Bernoulli process. These can be understood to be the flips of a coin, coming up heads or tails. Equivalently, one can write  the space of all (semi-)infinite strings of binary bits. The word "infinite" is qualified with "semi-", as one can also define a different space  consisting of all doubly-infinite (double-ended) strings; this will lead to the Baker's map. The qualification "semi-" is dropped below. 

This space has a natural shift operation, given by

where  is an infinite string of binary digits.  Given such a string, write

The resulting  is a real number in the unit interval  The shift  induces a homomorphism, also called , on the unit interval. Since  one can easily see that   For the doubly-infinite sequence of bits  the induced homomorphism is the Baker's map.

The dyadic sequence is then just the sequence

That is,

The Cantor set
Note that the sum

gives the Cantor function, as conventionally defined. This is one reason why the set  is sometimes called the Cantor set.

Rate of information loss and sensitive dependence on initial conditions
One hallmark of chaotic dynamics is the loss of information as simulation occurs. If we start with information on the first s bits of the initial iterate, then after m simulated iterations (m < s) we only have s − m bits of information remaining. Thus we lose information at the exponential rate of one bit per iteration. After s iterations, our simulation has reached the fixed point zero, regardless of the true iterate values; thus we have suffered a complete loss of information. This illustrates sensitive dependence on initial conditions—the mapping from the truncated initial condition has deviated exponentially from the mapping from the true initial condition. And since our simulation has reached a fixed point, for almost all initial conditions it will not describe the dynamics in the qualitatively correct way as chaotic.

Equivalent to the concept of information loss is the concept of information gain.  In practice some real-world process may generate a sequence of values (xn) over time, but we may only be able to observe these values in truncated form. Suppose for example that x0 = 0.1001101, but we only observe the truncated value 0.1001.  Our prediction for x1 is 0.001. If we wait until the real-world process has generated the true x1 value 0.001101, we will be able to observe the truncated value 0.0011, which is more accurate than our predicted value 0.001. So we have received an information gain of one bit.

Relation to tent map and logistic map
The dyadic transformation is topologically semi-conjugate to the unit-height tent map. Recall that the unit-height tent map is given by

The conjugacy is explicitly given by
 
so that

That is,  This is stable under iteration, as

It is also conjugate to the chaotic r = 4 case of the logistic map.  

There is also a semi-conjugacy between the dyadic transformation (here named angle doubling map) and the quadratic polynomial. Here, the map doubles angles measured in turns. That is, the map is given by

Periodicity and non-periodicity
Because of the simple nature of the dynamics when the iterates are viewed in binary notation, it is easy to categorize the dynamics based on the initial condition:

If the initial condition is irrational (as almost all points in the unit interval are), then the dynamics are non-periodic—this follows directly from the definition of an irrational number as one with a non-repeating binary expansion. This is the chaotic case.

If x0 is rational the image of x0 contains a finite number of distinct values within [0, 1) and the forward orbit of x0 is eventually periodic, with period equal to the period of the binary expansion of x0.  Specifically, if the initial condition is a rational number with a finite binary expansion of k bits, then after k iterations the iterates reach the fixed point 0;
if the initial condition is a rational number with a k-bit transient (k ≥ 0) followed by a q-bit sequence (q > 1) that repeats itself infinitely, then after k iterations the iterates reach a cycle of length q. Thus cycles of all lengths are possible.

For example, the forward orbit of 11/24 is:

 

which has reached a cycle of period 2.  Within any subinterval of [0, 1), no matter how small, there are therefore an infinite number of points whose orbits are eventually periodic, and an infinite number of points whose orbits are never periodic. This sensitive dependence on initial conditions is a characteristic of chaotic maps.

Periodicity via bit shifts
The periodic and non-periodic orbits can be more easily understood not by working with the map  directly, but rather with the bit shift map  defined on the Cantor space .

That is, the homomorphism

is basically a statement that the Cantor set can be mapped into the reals. It is a surjection: every dyadic rational has not one, but two distinct representations in the Cantor set. For example, 

This is just the binary-string version of the famous 0.999... = 1 problem. The doubled representations hold in general: for any given finite-length initial sequence  of length , one has

The initial sequence  corresponds to the non-periodic part of the orbit, after which iteration settles down to all zeros (equivalently, all-ones).

Expressed as bit strings, the periodic orbits of the map can be seen to the rationals. It is not hard to see that such repeating sequences correspond to rational numbers. Writing

one then clearly has

Tacking on the initial non-repeating sequence, one clearly has a rational number. In fact, every rational number can be expressed in this way: an initial "random" sequence, followed by a cycling repeat.  That is, the periodic orbits of the map are in one-to-one correspondence with the rationals.

This phenomenon is note-worthy, because something similar happens in many chaotic systems. For example, geodesics on compact manifolds can have periodic orbits that behave in this way.

Keep in mind, however, that the rationals are a set of measure zero in the reals. Almost all orbits are not periodic! The aperiodic orbits correspond to the irrational numbers. This property also holds true in a more general setting. An open question is to what degree the behavior of the periodic orbits constrain the behavior of the system as a whole.  Phenomena such as Arnold diffusion suggest that the general answer is "not very much".

Density formulation
Instead of looking at the orbits of individual points under the action of the map, it is equally worthwhile to explore how the map affects densities on the unit interval. That is, imagine sprinkling some dust on the unit interval; it is denser in some places than in others.  What happens to this density as one iterates?

Write  as this density, so that .

 

By convention, such maps are denoted by  so that in this case, write

Viewed as a linear operator, the most obvious and pressing question is: what is its spectrum? One eigenvalue is obvious: if  for all  then one obviously has  so the uniform density is invariant under the transformation. This is in fact the largest eigenvalue of the operator , it is the Frobenius–Perron eigenvalue. The uniform density is, in fact, nothing other than the invariant measure of the dyadic transformation.

This might be the space of Lebesgue measurable functions, or perhaps the space of square integrable functions, or perhaps even just polynomials. Working with any of these spaces is surprisingly difficult, although a spectrum can be obtained.

Borel space
A vast amount of simplification results if one instead works with the Cantor space , and functions  Some caution is advised, as the map  is defined on the unit interval of the real number line, assuming the natural topology on the reals.  By contrast, the map  is defined on the Cantor space , which by convention is given a very different topology, the product topology. There is a potential clash of topologies; some care must be taken. However, as presented above, there is a homomorphism from the Cantor set into the reals; fortunately, it maps open sets into open sets, and thus preserves notions of continuity.

To work with the Cantor set , one must provide a topology for it; by convention, this is the product topology. By adjoining set-complements, it can be extended to a Borel space, that is, a sigma algebra. The topology is that of cylinder sets. A cylinder set has the generic form

These are the open sets of the topology. The canonical measure on this space is the Bernoulli measure for the fair coin-toss. If there is just one bit specified in the string of arbitrary positions, the measure is 1/2. If there are two bits specified, the measure is 1/4, and so on. One can get fancier: given a real number  one can define a measure

if there are  heads and  tails in the sequence.

So, for example,  maps to the interval  and  maps to the interval  and both of these intervals have a measure of 1/2. Similarly,  maps to the interval  which still has the measure 1/2. That is, the embedding above preserves the measure.

An alternative is to write

which preserves the measure  That is, it maps such that the measure on the unit interval is again the Lebesgue measure.

Frobenius–Perron operator

This linear operator is called the transfer operator or the Ruelle–Frobenius–Perron operator.  The largest eigenvalue is the Frobenius–Perron eigenvalue, and in this case, it is 1.  The associated eigenvector is the invariant measure: in this case, it is the Bernoulli measure. Again,  when

Spectrum
In this case, the operator has a discrete spectrum, and the eigenfunctions are (curiously) the Bernoulli polynomials! (This coincidence of naming was presumably not known to Bernoulli.)

Indeed, one can easily verify that

This follows because the Bernoulli polynomials obey the identity

Note that 

Another basis is provided by the Haar basis, and the functions spanning the space are the Haar wavelets. In this case, one finds a continuous spectrum, consisting of the unit disk on the complex plane. Given  in the unit disk, so that , the functions

obey

for  This is a complete basis, in that every integer can be written in the form  The Bernoulli polynomials are recovered by setting  and 

A complete basis can be given in other ways, as well; they may be written in terms of the Hurwitz zeta function. Another complete basis is provided by the Takagi function. This is a fractal, differentiable-nowhere function. The eigenfunctions are explicitly of the form

where  is the triangle wave. One has, again,

All of these different bases can be expressed as linear combinations of one-another. In this sense, they are equivalent. 

The fractal eigenfunctions show an explicit symmetry under the fractal groupoid of the modular group; this is developed in greater detail in the article on the Takagi function (the blancmange curve). Perhaps not a surprise; the Cantor set has exactly the same set of symmetries (as do the continued fractions.) This then leads elegantly into the theory of elliptic equations and modular forms.

Relation to the Ising model
The Hamiltonian of the zero-field one-dimensional Ising model of  spins with periodic boundary conditions can be written as

Letting  be a suitably chosen normalization constant and  be the inverse temperature for the system, the partition function for this model is given by

We can implement the renormalization group by integrating out every other spin. In so doing, one finds that  can also be equated with the partition function for a smaller system with but  spins,

In that case we can introduce a parameter  related to  via the equation

and the resulting renormalization group transformation for  will be precisely the dyadic map:

See also
 Bernoulli process
 Bernoulli scheme
 Gilbert–Shannon–Reeds model, a random distribution on permutations given by applying the doubling map to a set of n uniformly random points on the unit interval

Notes

References

 Dean J. Driebe, Fully Chaotic Maps and Broken Time Symmetry, (1999) Kluwer Academic Publishers, Dordrecht Netherlands 
 Linas Vepstas, The Bernoulli Map, the Gauss-Kuzmin-Wirsing Operator and the Riemann Zeta, (2004)

Chaotic maps